John Fielder (born 1950) is an American landscape photographer, nature writer, publisher of over 40 books, and conservationist.  He is nationally known for his landscape photography, scenic calendars (which have been published for over 30 years) and for his many coffee table books and travel guides—including Colorado's best-selling Colorado 1870–2000, in which he matches the same scenes of classic photographs taken in the 19th century by photographer William Henry Jackson. Fielder has won the Colorado Book Award three times, in 1996, 1997, and 2000. In January 2023, Fielder released the entirety of his over 5,000 photographs into the public domain, with History Colorado as caretaker.

Fielder has worked to promote the protection of Colorado open space and wildlands. His photography has influenced people and legislation, earning him recognition, including the Sierra Club's Ansel Adams Award in 1993, and in 2011, the Aldo Leopold Foundation's first Achievement Award given to an individual. He was an original governor-appointed member of the lottery-related Board of Great Outdoors Colorado, and speaks to thousands of people each year to rally support for land use and environmental issues.

Biography
A Washington, DC, native, Fielder moved to Colorado upon graduation from Duke University. After working eight years for department stores, he turned his photography hobby into a profession.

Exhibitions
 Colorado History Museum:  Colorado 1870-2000, then and now, II, September 2005-April 2006, Denver, Colorado
 The Wildlife Experience, permanent exhibit, Parker, Colorado

Awards
 Ansel Adams Award for Conservation Photography, 1993
 Colorado Book Award, 1996, 1997, 2000
 National Outdoor Book Award (Design and Artistic Merit), Mountain Ranges of Colorado, 2005
 National Outdoor Book Award (Outdoor Adventure Guidebook), Colorado's Continental Divide Trail, 1998

Published works
 Colorado 1870-2000 (2000) Boulder, Colo.: Westcliffe Publishers .
 Colorado 1870-2000 II (2005) Boulder, Colo.: Westcliffe Publishers, .
 Colorado 1870-2000 Revisited (2001), coauthored with Thomas J. Noel, Boulder, Colo.: Big Earth Publishing, .
 Mountain Ranges of Colorado Boulder, Colo.: Westcliffe Publishers, .
 To Walk in Wilderness (coauthored with T.A. Barron), Boulder, Colo.: Westcliffe Publishers, .
 Along the Colorado Trail (coauthored with M. John Fayhee), Boulder, Colo.: Westcliffe Publishers, .
 Colorado: Lost Places and Forgotten Words Boulder, Colo.: Westcliffe Publishers, 
 John Fielder's Best of Colorado Boulder, Colo.: Westcliffe Publishers, .
 The Complete Guide to Colorado's Wilderness Areas (coauthored with Mark Pearson)
 A Colorado Winter Boulder, Colo.: Westcliffe Publishers, .
 Photographing the Landscape Boulder, Colo.: Westcliffe Publishers, .

References

External links
 John Fielder Collection: A collection of 5,000 images, managed by History Colorado
 Denver Post book review: A Colorado Winter
 John Fielder's Colorado
 Photomedia Magazine: "John Fielder: head for the mountains"

American photographers
Nature photographers
Artists from Colorado
1950 births
Living people
Sierra Club awardees